Nawab Haji Syed Ahmad Ali Khan Bahadur (died 1786 AD) was the first Nawab of Doolighat who wrote under the nom de plume of 'Qayamat'.

He is remembered for the establishment of Azadari in Azimabad with the foundation of Imambaras at Doolighat and Sangidalan in 1722 AD. 

He left behind a valuable Diwan in Persian, constituting 1295 Ghazals named Haidernameh. A few of the couplets from this book are mentioned in Tazkerat-al-Akabir by Nawab Nejat Hussain Khan 'Ashki' republished in 'Shoara Ke Tazkire' by Qazi Abdul Wadood.

References

1786 deaths
Year of birth missing